The Special Service Unit (SSU) is a component of the California Department of Corrections and Rehabilitation (CDCR). The unit is staffed by special agents[1] assigned to field offices throughout the state. Although the special agents work for CDCR, they are neither correctional officers nor parole agents. SSU special agents are full-time peace officers per California Penal Code Section 830.2. This makes agents more akin to state police officers than to correctional officers.[2]

SSU agents conduct criminal investigations with a nexus to current and discharged CDCR inmates and state parolees on the street. They monitor prison gangs, gather criminal intelligence, and conduct narcotics enforcement. Special agents work closely with other law enforcement agencies, such as the Federal Bureau of Investigation, the California Department of Justice, county sheriff's departments, and local police. They often assist prison correctional investigators with investigations connected to individuals in the community. These investigations usually involve people introducing drugs or contraband into the prisons. SSU special agents hold the equivalency rank of a CDCR captain. SSU agents attempt to keep a low profile and small footprint while conducting their missions throughout the state.

History 

The Special Service Unit was formed in 1964 at the request of California Governor Pat Brown. The unit's formation is said to have evolved after the March 9, 1963, kidnapping of two Los Angeles police officers. Joseph Wambaugh's bestselling book, The Onion Field, documented this incident. The abduction and subsequent murder of one of the officers were committed by two state parolees, Gregory Powell and Jimmy Lee Smith (a.k.a. Jimmy Youngblood). Plainclothes LAPD officers Ian Campbell and Karl Hettinger were working the Hollywood Area and conducted a routine traffic stop at the corner of Carlos Avenue and Gower Street. Convicts Powell and Smith were in the car. As the officers conducted their stop, the parolees produced guns and overpowered the officers. The officers were forced into Powell's car and driven out of the city. Powell and Smith drove them north from Los Angeles to an onion field near Bakersfield, California. Officer Campbell was shot and killed in the field; Officer Hettinger was able to escape.[1] In the police investigation that ensued, the ability of LAPD detectives to get timely and necessary information from the Department of Corrections was severely hampered, ostensibly by the size and bureaucracy of the department. Detectives needed a way to obtain information quickly and access CDCR records and resources.

In late 1963, the Governor’s Conference on Violence was convened in Los Angeles, California. A sub-committee was formed consisting of Attorney General Thomas Lynch, Los Angeles Police Chief William Parker, San Francisco Police Chief Thomas Cahill, Oakland Police Chief Edward Toothman, Alameda County Superior Court Judge Folger Emerson, Governor’s Executive Clemency Secretary John McInerney, Marin County District Attorney Roger Garrity, and San Joaquin County Sheriff Mike Canliss. One of the recommendations from the sub-committee was the formation of a unit within the Department of Corrections aimed at establishing and furthering liaison activities between the CDC, street law enforcement, district attorneys, and the courts. A decision was made to form a specialized unit within CDCR to liaison between the department and outside agencies.

CDCR Assistant Director Charles Casey was tasked with creating this new unit. Director Casey learned of a New York Department of Corrections team that ostensibly bridged the gap between New York state parole services and local law enforcement. Casey went to New York and met with Russell H. Oswald, the New York State Parole Board chairman and founder of the New York Bureau of Special Services. Based on his study and evaluation of the Bureau of Special Services, Casey returned to California and designed his team. After the state legislature approved its formation, the Law Enforcement Intelligence and Liaison Unit (later shortened to Law Enforcement Intelligence Unit {LEIU}) officially went into service in April 1964. The unit initially consisted of six special agents. In 1966, four additional special agents were added to the team. The name was changed to the Special Service Unit. By 1975, there were three regional SSU offices in Sacramento, Corte Madera, and El Monte.

Function 
SSU serves as the primary investigative unit for CDCR on cases that evolve from prison or parolees or have a direct nexus to CDCR. According to its official description, SSU "conducts the major criminal investigations..., criminal apprehension efforts of prison escapees and parolees wanted for serious and violent felonies, is the primary departmental gang management unit, conducts complex gang-related investigations of inmates and parolees suspected of criminal gang activity, and is the administrative investigative and law enforcement liaison unit." In layman's terms, the unit is multifaceted and does whatever it is asked to keep communities safe.

Special agents come from a variety of backgrounds. Some have worked their way up through CDCR as correctional officers or parole agents. An internal candidate must hold the equivalent rank of lieutenant or above to apply to SSU. Law enforcement officers from outside agencies can also apply. They come from local police, sheriff's departments, or other state police services. Those individuals ordinarily come with an extensive investigative and tactical background, usually having served in a detective unit and on a special weapons and tactics team (SWAT). An external candidate must take a written exam and be ranked on a list.

When an opening becomes available in one of the field offices, candidates on the list will be offered an oral interview. If selected, the candidate will have to pass an extensive background check, as well as physical and psychological exams, to be offered a position with the unit.

Current Structure of SSU

 
The current configuration of the Special Service Unit remains true to its origins—small and mobile. As of 2018, CDCR reports there are less than forty SSU special agents. They are based throughout California in clandestine, off-site locations. Every agent is equipped with tactical and surveillance equipment and unmarked, uncover vehicles; they are ready to respond anywhere within the state at a moment's notice.

In 2005, CDCR consolidated various divisions and units to realign its organizational structure. During that time, the Office of Correctional Safety (OCS) was created, which serves as the "special operations division" for the CDCR. Within the OCS are groups such as the Fugitive Apprehension Team (FAT), the Emergency Operations Unit (EOU) and the Criminal Intelligence Analysis Unit (CIAU). SSU became a branch of the OCS, which elevated the training and tactical acumen of the unit. EOU is CDCR's tactical training cadre. They are responsible for training all CDCR Crisis Response Teams (SWAT teams) throughout the state. With the OCS merger, SSU special agents were expected to maintain a higher level of tactical firearms proficiency and high-risk entry training. Although not considered a special weapons and tactics team (SWAT) by Califiornia POST standards, many agents are former SWAT operators from previous agencies or assignments. SSU is regarded as a “high-risk warrant service team” by California standards.

As the "detective unit" for the Department of Corrections, SSU special agents are responsible for keeping current on the latest investigative techniques and case law. Special agents work hand-in-hand with law enforcement investigators from all branches of government. Many SSU agents are assigned to regional task forces throughout California, and a handful are cross-designated as federal task force officers with such national partners as the Drug Enforcement Administration (DEA), Federal Bureau of Investigation (FBI), and the Bureau of Alcohol, Tobacco, and Firearms (ATF).

Training 

SSU agents maintain a rigorous training regimen. Because they are called upon for different mission sets, the agents must be able to operate in different environments. Agents are expected to be proficient in writing skills for preparing criminal reports, surveillance logs, and crafting search warrants. They must also be good communicators, as they interact with the highest ranks in law enforcement to the most dangerous criminals in the state. Agents also develop and operate confidential informants to further their cases, which is a skill in and of itself. Conducting covert surveillance is a skill and an art that each agent must master.

SSU functions as a “tactical detective unit,” meaning that although they are not a SWAT team, they must operate at a much higher level than a traditional police officer or detective. They serve their own search and arrest warrants and assist other agencies that do not have a warrant service unit. To maintain their firearms skillset, SSU requires monthly range training and qualifications. Agents must pass a rigorous qualification course designed by CDCR's EOU team. They must pass with each weapon system they carry, including the M4 carbine, Remington short-barreled shotgun, 9mm pistol, and any secondary firearm. Agents conduct close-quarter defense training, tactical entry training, live-fire shoot house training, vehicle assaults, and officer rescue training.

Agents have received training from elite police units such as the LAPD SWAT team, the LAPD Special Investigation Section (SIS), and the Los Angeles Sheriff's Department Special Enforcement Bureau. Agents have also trained with military personnel from units such as the United States Navy SEALs and United States Army Special Forces.

Prison Escapes

One of the primary functions of SSU is the investigation and apprehension of state prison escapees. The number of prison escapes from California prisons is not officially published. However, a 2018 CDCR press release webpage article states, "Since 1977, 99 percent of all offenders who have left an adult institution, camp or community-based program without permission have been apprehended." The press release says that the Special Service Unit is the specialized unit tasked with hunting down prison escapees. The press release states, "[It is] the primary departmental link with allied law enforcement agencies and the Governor’s Office of Emergency Services" and "The OCS mission is to protect the public and serve CDCR investigative and security interests. OCS is the primary departmental link with allied law enforcement agencies and the Governor’s Office of Emergency Services." A large majority of the escapes occur from minimum-security facilities, such as fire camps. Inmates are also placed back in the community through the Alternative Custody Program (ACP) and will sometimes flee instead of completing the program. These are considered prison escapes by state statute.

One of the most high-profile prison escapes occurred from Folsom State Prison on June 5, 1987. Inmate Glen Godwin, a convicted murderer, escaped the then-maximum security prison. He reportedly escaped through a storm drain and into the American River, which flows adjacent to the west side of the prison. Godwin has been featured on several television documentaries and was on the FBI Ten Most Wanted Fugitives list for twenty years. The case is still open and being worked as a cold case by investigators.

In August 2014, convicted murderer Scott Landers escaped from the back of a CDCR transport van while on Interstate 5 just north of Atwater, California Landers had been convicted of stabbing a 61-year-old man inRiverside County and was serving twenty-five years to life. Upon his escape, SSU agents were called in from across the state to assist with his apprehension. Within twenty-four hours, the escaped murderer was caught and brought back into custody.

High Profile Cases
The Special Service Unit has been quietly involved in numerous high-profile cases throughout its fifty-year history. One example is the Patricia Hearst kidnapping by the Symbionese Liberation Army (SLA) in 1974. The SLA was a radical left-wing organization formed in Soledad Prison by Donald DeFreeze. In 1973 Defreeze escaped from prison and led the SLA on the streets when they kidnapped Hearst. The day after Hearst's kidnapping, special agents from the unit's San Francisco office provided police with photographs of suspects who matched the description of one of the abductors. Thanks to photographs supplied by SSU, DeFreeze was positively identified as one of Hearst's abductors. That identification led to a lengthy investigation of SLA and its origin behind prison walls.

Another example is the high-profile murders that shook Los Angeles in the late sixties. The murders were committed by Charles Manson cult members and became known as Helter Skelter. During the investigation into the cult, SSU special agents were requested by Los Angeles Police to interview Bruce Davis, a Manson follower. He had been convicted of the 1969 Gary Hinman murder in Los Angeles. Davis was a Manson devotee whom police were trying to turn as an informant into many of the open murders linked to the Manson Family.

On January 26, 2001, San Francisco resident Diane Whipple was attacked and killed by two large Presa Canario dogs in the hallway of her apartment building. The dogs, Bane and Hera, were owned by Whipple's neighbors, Marjorie Knoller and Robert Noel. The dogs' actual owner, Paul Schneider, was a high-ranking member of the Brotherhood prisongang serving a life sentence in Pelican Bay State Prison. The Special Service Unit had been investigating the Aryan Brotherhood and its illegal dog breeding business for several months before the death of Whipple. SSU assisted local law enforcement during the investigation and prosecution of Knoller and Noel.

In August 2009, Phillip Garrido was arrested in Antioch, California, for the kidnapping of Jaycee Dugard. He had kidnapped her eighteen years prior and kept her in captivity. The Hayward, California police department was interested in Garrido related to the 1988 kidnapping of nine-year-old Michaela Garecht. Special agents from SSU assisted the detectives from the Hayward Police Department in the ensuing investigation. In 2011, they assisted in conducting interviews with Garrido and his wife, Nancy Garrido, who had been sentenced to state prison in California.In February 2012, the Occupy Movement conducted a protest at the east gate of San Quentin Prison, located in Marin County, California SSU special agents worked undercover and infiltrated the group of protestors. Their mission was to gain intelligence if the protest turned violent or the prison's security was compromised.

In 2012, SSU special agents became involved in the Speed Freak Killers investigation. Agents interviewed convicted serial killer Wesley Shermantine at San Quentin State Prison. Shermantine was a condemned inmate awaiting execution on death row. Shermantine provided agents with information about the whereabouts of victims’ bodies, buried in Calaveras and San Joaquin counties. He claimed the remains were those of victims he and his childhood friend, Loren Herzog, had murdered. In August 2012, SSU agents conducted a covert transport of Shermantine from Death Row to the areas he described in Calaveras County and San Joaquin County. Shermantine directed SSU to where he and Herzog had allegedly buried their victims. FBI Evidence Response Team agents marked the locations identified by the serial killer and later conducted forensic excavations searching for human remains.

In February 2018, SSU culminated a year-long operation with the Federal Bureau of Investigation, code-named "Silent Night." The investigation focused on the Nuestra Familia prison gang and its control over Northern California communities. The investigation centered on Woodland, California, and the street gang called "Varrio Bosque Norteno." An arrest sweep of 29 suspects took place on February 14, 2018.

On June 6, 2019, The United States Attorney's Office in Sacramento, California, indicted sixteen members and associates of the Aryan Brotherhood prison gang; the indictments stemmed from a five-year investigation led by the Drug Enforcement Administration and the Special Service Unit. The government alleged that top officials within the Aryan Brotherhood organization used smuggled phones to order murders and orchestrate a multi-state drug trafficking operation from their prison cells.

References 

Corrections
California